Anthimus IV, (1785 – 1878) was twice Ecumenical Patriarch of Constantinople, between 1840 and 1841, and between 1848 and 1852. He was born in Constantinople and served as Chancellor of the Ecumenical Patriarchate before being elected Metropolitan of Ikonion (Konya) between 1825 and 1835, Larissa between 1835 and 1837, and Nikomedeia between 1837 and 1840.

He was elected Ecumenical Patriarch in 1840, however was dismissed by Ottoman Sultan Abdülmecid I in 1842 and withdrew to the Princes' Islands. He was elected again as Ecumenical Patriarch again in 1848. During his second term, he held secret negotiations with the Church of Greece, which had declared itself autocephalous in 1833. In 1850, he issued a Patriarchal and Synodical Act declaring the autocephaly of the Church of Greece in accordance with canon law.

In 1852, he was dismissed again and withdrew to the Princes' Islands, where he remained until his death in 1878.

References
Ecumenical Patriarchate: Anthimos IV

1878 deaths
Bishops of Larissa
19th-century Ecumenical Patriarchs of Constantinople
1785 births